International Solomon University (ISU) is a non-governmental higher education institution in Ukraine.

It was founded in 1991. In 1991-1994 Professor Alexander Tetelbaum was the President-founder of ISU. Teaching at the ISU begun on September 1, 1993.

The supreme body of ISU management is the Board of Founders, headed by R.M. Shapshovych. The Board of Founders and the Supervisory Council of ISU are represented by famous scholars and social and political figures.

The management of the current ISU activity is carried out by the rector - Professor, Doctor of Economics A. Rozenfeld. The ISU vice-rector — Professor G. Finin.

The Eastern-Ukrainian Affiliated Department in Kharkiv  prepares specialists in History, Software, Finance and Marketing.

External links
Official site

Universities in Ukraine
Universities and colleges in Kyiv
Educational institutions established in 1991
1991 establishments in Ukraine